Handsome Ned was the stage name of Robin David Masyk (June 4, 1957 – January 10, 1987), a Canadian country singer and songwriter. Although he only released a small number of singles and was never widely known outside of Toronto during his lifetime, he has been credited as the catalyst for an early-1980s country music and roots rock revival in Toronto which paved the way for acts such as Blue Rodeo, Prairie Oyster, Skydiggers and Cowboy Junkies to break through to greater fame, and as one of the key figures in the transformation of the city's Queen Street West district into a cultural hotspot.

As well, he received a posthumous Juno Award nomination for Best Male Country Vocalist at the Juno Awards of 1990 after some of his archival recordings were released in 1989 as the album The Ballad of Handsome Ned.

Background
Masyk was born in 1957 in Zweibrücken, West Germany, to parents in the Canadian military. He returned with his family to Stoney Creek, Ontario in 1970. He was a fan in this era of proto-punk music such as Iggy and the Stooges and The Velvet Underground. After discovering a taste for classic country music of the 1950s, he moved to Austin, Texas for a year to learn more about the genre and then moved back to Toronto in 1979.

Career
Initially, Masyk and his brother Jim started a band called The Velours, whose material consisted primarily of Elvis Presley and Velvet Underground covers with some original songs. In 1981, the band was joined by Ronny Azzopardi of The Next and J. D. Weatherstone of The Demics, and changed its name to The Sidewinders. They performed several shows as an opening act for The Viletones, increasing their popularity and soon becoming a headlining draw in their own right. He hosted a weekly residency at the Cameron House tavern on Queen Street West, playing there as a headliner and providing a platform for other like-minded artists.

Over the course of his career, he performed under several different band names including The Sidewinders, The Hayseed Hellions, The Running Kind, The Handsome Neds and The New Neds. He released a small number of independent singles both as a solo artist and with the Sidewinders, and was a regular organizer of country-themed music events such as the "Handsome Ned Picnic" and "Honky Tonk Heart". The Handsome Ned Picnic, an annual event for at least three years, included acts such as The Razorbacks and Shadowy Men on a Shadowy Planet as performers, while Honky Tonk Heart, a one-off show at The Horseshoe Tavern in 1985, included the second-ever live performance by Blue Rodeo.

In addition, he was the host of a weekly country music show on CKLN-FM called Honky-Tonk Hardwood Floor Show, and appeared in an advertising campaign for Molson Export in 1986.

Death and legacy
Masyk died of a heroin overdose on January 10, 1987. Murray McLauchlan, who had been preparing to produce Masyk's debut album, hosted a special tribute episode of the CKLN show a few days after his death. Following his funeral, hundreds of fans lined Queen Street for a funeral procession.

"Put the Blame on Me", his best-known song, was featured on the soundtrack to Bruce McDonald's film Roadkill in 1989. In the same year, Jim Masyk compiled and remastered archival recordings of Ned's songs for the album The Ballad of Handsome Ned, resulting in Ned's posthumous Juno nomination. Jim Masyk later compiled another two-CD set of additional archival recordings, which was released in 2000 as The Name Is Ned.

Filmmakers Chris Terry and Ross Edmunds released the documentary film You Left Me Blue: The Handsome Ned Story in 2010.

References

1957 births
1987 deaths
Canadian alternative country singers
Canadian rockabilly musicians
20th-century Canadian male singers
Deaths by heroin overdose
Musicians from Toronto
Drug-related deaths in Canada